The Highlandtown Arts District (a.k.a. "ha!" and Highlandtown Arts and Entertainment District) is the largest such designated area in the state of Maryland, encompassing the southeast Baltimore neighborhoods of Highlandtown, Patterson Park and portions of the Canton and Greektown neighborhoods. In the Highlandtown Arts District, artists live and work in an area known for cultural diversity. The "ha!" district has extensive retail and industrial spaces, along with affordable housing, with easy access to Interstate 95, Interstate 895, Fell's Point and Downtown Baltimore.

Events held in "ha!" include the Great Halloween Lantern Parade, a farmer's market, the Artket festival, Salsapolkalooza, and Highlandtown Wine Festival.

References

External sources
 Highlandtown Community Association
 Schiavone Fine Art
 Creative Alliance
 Southeast Community Development Corporation
 Highlandtown Merchants Association
 Friends of Patterson Park
 Di Pasquale's Italian Marketplace
 Greetings from Highlandtown
 SkyLofts Studios and Gallery

Canton, Baltimore
Highlandtown, Baltimore
Parks in Baltimore
Arts districts